This is a list of notable spit-roasted foods, consisting of dishes and foods that are roasted on a rotisserie, or spit. Rotisserie is a style of roasting where meat is skewered on a spit, a long solid rod used to hold food while it is being cooked over a fire in a fireplace or over a campfire, or roasted in an oven. Spit-roasting typically involves the use of indirect heat, which usually cooks foods at a lower temperature compared to other roasting methods that use direct heat. When cooking meats, the nature of the food constantly revolving on a spit also creates a self-basting process. Spit roasting dates back to ancient times, and spit-roasted fowl and game "was common in ancient societies".

Spit-roasted foods

 Al pastor – a dish developed in central Mexico that is based on shawarma spit-grilled meat brought by Lebanese immigrants to Mexico.
 Cabrito al pastor – A northern Mexico dish consisting of a whole goat kid carcass that is opened flat and cooked on a spit
 Cağ kebabı – a horizontally stacked marinated rotating lamb kebab variety, originating in Turkey's Erzurum Province
 Doner kebab – seasoned meat stacked in the shape of an inverted cone is turned slowly on a rotisserie, next to a vertical cooking element. The outer layer is sliced into thin shavings as it cooks.
 Gyros – a Greek dish made from meat cooked on a vertical rotisserie
 Inihaw - a general Filipino term for grilled or spit-roasted meat or seafood
 Lechon - a general Spanish term for whole spit-roasted pig common in Spain, Latin America, and the Philippines
 Lechon manok – a Filipino spit-roasted chicken dish made with chicken marinated in a mixture of garlic, bay leaf, onion, black pepper, soy sauce, and patis (fish sauce).
 Méchoui – a dish in North African cuisine consisting of a whole sheep or a lamb spit-roasted on a barbecue.
 Obersteiner Spießbraten – a culinary specialty of Idar-Oberstein, Germany consisting of a rolled roast using beef or pork neck.
 Paksiw na lechon – a Filipino dish consisting of leftover spit-roasted pork (lechon) meat cooked in lechon sauce or its component ingredients of vinegar, garlic, onions, black pepper and ground liver or liver spread and some water.
 Rotisserie chicken – a chicken dish cooked on a rotisserie, whereby the chicken is placed next to the heat source to cook it
 Pollo a la Brasa – a common dish of Peruvian cuisine and one of the most consumed in Peru, it is a rotisserie chicken dish that is a Peruvian version of pollo al spiedo. 
 Shawarma – a Middle Eastern meat preparation based on the doner kebab of Ottoman Turkey
 Siu mei – the generic name in Cantonese cuisine given to meats roasted on spits over an open fire or a huge wood burning rotisserie oven. 
 Spettekaka – a local dessert in some southern areas of Sweden, the name means "cake on a spit", which describes its method of preparation.
 Spit cake – a European cake made with layers of dough or batter deposited, one at a time, onto a tapered cylindrical rotating spit
 Baumkuchen – a German variety of spit cake
 Kürtőskalács – a spit cake specific to Hungarian-speaking regions in Romania, more predominantly the Székely Land, and popular in Hungary and Romania
 Baumstriezel – a similar pastry to Kürtőskalács originating from the Saxon communities of Transylvania
 Trdelník – a spit cake similar to Kürtőskalács popular in Slovakia and Czechia
 Šakotis – a Polish-Lithuanian traditional spit cake
 Suckling pig – traditionally cooked whole, often roasted, in various cuisines, and sometimes cooked on a rotisserie

Gallery

See also

 List of barbecue dishes
 List of cooking techniques
 List of kebabs
 List of meat dishes
 List of smoked foods
 Pig roast
 :Category:Skewered foods

References

Further reading

External links
 

 
Spit-roasted foods